The renal capsule is a tough fibrous layer surrounding the kidney and covered in a layer of perirenal fat known as the adipose capsule of kidney. The adipose capsule is sometimes included in the structure of the renal capsule. It provides some protection from trauma and damage. The renal capsule is surrounded by the renal fascia. Overlying the renal fascia and between this and the transverse fascia is a region of pararenal fat.

Structure 
The renal capsule surrounds the functional tissue of the kidney, and is itself surrounded by a fatty adipose capsule, fascia, and fat. From the inner part of the kidney to outside the kidney, the positioning of the capsule is:
 renal medulla 
 renal cortex
 renal capsule
 adipose capsule of kidney (or perirenal fat, or perinephric fat)
 renal fascia
 pararenal fat
 peritoneum (anteriorly), and transverse fascia (posteriorly).

Sometimes the adipose capsule of the kidney also known as the perirenal fat, is regarded as a part of the renal capsule.

See also 
 Renal medulla
 Renal pyramid
 Renal artery
 Renal vein

References

External links 
 
 

Kidney anatomy